The Cosmos Rocks is the only studio album by Queen + Paul Rodgers (and Queen's sixteenth studio album overall), released on 15 September 2008. It contains 14 new tracks written by Brian May, Roger Taylor, and Paul Rodgers. This is the first studio album of new material from the two remaining members of Queen since 1995's Made in Heaven.

History
The band entered Roger Taylor's Priory studio in late 2006, having completed the American leg of a world tour. Sessions were initially scheduled around Rodgers' other touring commitments. On tour, the band had debuted a new song, "Take Love", which did not make the album. On his solo tour, Rodgers debuted songs such as "Warboys" and "Voodoo".

John Deacon's retirement meant that bass duties were shared between Rodgers and May.

The first single, "Say It's Not True" was released nine months before the album. The second, "C-lebrity" was previewed on Al Murray's Happy Hour in April, five months before the album.

The album's release came 17 years after the death in 1991 of former Queen singer Freddie Mercury.

"It had some great stuff on it," Taylor recalled. "I just think that Paul's more blues and soul – one of our favourite singers, ever, but, when it boils down to it, he wasn't the perfect frontman for us. I felt the album was badly promoted by EMI, who were falling to bits at the time. We were on tour in Europe, and I went into record stores and we weren't in them. And I remember being furious, thinking, 'Why did we make this fucking record?'"

Singles
Three singles were released from the album:

 "Say It's Not True" was the lead single from the album, released in the UK on 31 December 2007; it reached #90 in the British charts although had been available as free download for some time. Its video features many clips of the suffering in South Africa as well as clips from Nelson Mandela's 46664 concerts. The single was released for the 46664 charity, with all proceeds being donated there.
 "C-lebrity" was released as the album's second single on 8 September 2008, reaching number 33 on the UK Singles Chart. Its B-side was a recording of "Fire and Water" live in Japan.
 "We Believe" was released as a promo single in Italy, and reached number 4 in the Virgin radio charts. It was edited down from its original 6-minute album version to less than 4 minutes.

Critical reaction

The Cosmos Rocks received mixed reviews. According to critic review aggregator Metacritic, the album received an average review score of 42/100, indicating "Mixed or average reviews". Alexis Petridis of The Guardian gave it two out of five stars, stating, "the lyrics were stupid, trite, a bit offensive and bound to have an undermining effect on whatever musical efforts they put behind it". Conversely, PopMatters gave it a 7/10 review, stating, "Paul Rodgers breathes new life into Queen, while still keeping the band's tremendous legacy intact as they soldier forth with new material into the 21st century". Mojo gave it three stars, stating, "Occasionally they stumble, as on the clunky 'Warboys.' But with Rodgers imperious, Queen's second coming is vindicated".

Tour

The "Rock the Cosmos Tour" began in September 2008 to promote the release of this album. The opening date was recorded for a DVD release, and was broadcast across digital video theatres across the United States on 6 November 2008 under the title "Let the Cosmos Rock". The tour included one of the largest open-air concerts in Kharkiv, Ukraine, which garnered 350,000 people. Over the course of the tour, Queen played to just short of a million viewers.

Track listing

Original release
All regular tracks credited to Queen + Paul Rodgers.

Limited edition bonus DVD (Super Live in Japan – Highlights)
 "Reaching Out" (Hill, Black)
 "Tie Your Mother Down" (May)
 "Fat Bottomed Girls" (May)
 "Another One Bites the Dust" (Deacon)
 "Fire and Water" (Rodgers, Andy Fraser)
 "Crazy Little Thing Called Love" (Mercury)
 "Teo Torriatte (Let Us Cling Together)" (May)
 "These Are the Days of Our Lives" (Queen)
 "Radio Ga Ga" (Taylor)
 "Can’t Get Enough" (Mick Ralphs)
 "I Was Born to Love You" (Mercury)
 "All Right Now" (Rodgers, Fraser)
 "We Will Rock You" (May)
 "We Are the Champions" (Mercury)
 "God Save the Queen" (Traditional; arranged by May)
Note: The Japanese edition includes a CD audio version instead of the DVD.

Personnel
 Brian May – guitar, backing and lead vocals, bass, keyboards, piano
 Roger Taylor – drums, backing and lead vocals, percussion, keyboards
 Paul Rodgers – lead vocals, guitar, bass, keyboards, piano, harmonica
 Taylor Hawkins – backing vocals on "C-lebrity"

Charts

Certifications

Formats
 Standard CD
 Special edition CD and DVD
 Tour edition (Queen Online only)
 Gatefold vinyl
 iTunes Music Store edition

References

External links
 
 Queen official website: Discography: The Cosmos Rocks: includes lyrics of all non-bonus tracks.
 

2008 debut albums
Hollywood Records albums
Parlophone albums
Queen + Paul Rodgers albums